Andrés Arizaleta (born 23 February 1950) is a Venezuelan footballer. He played in three matches for the Venezuela national football team in 1975. He was also part of Venezuela's squad for the 1975 Copa América tournament.

References

1950 births
Living people
Venezuelan footballers
Venezuela international footballers
Place of birth missing (living people)
Association football goalkeepers
Portuguesa F.C. players